Chord Line may refer to a railway line in India:
 Chord Line, Tamil Nadu, in Tamil Nadu state
 Grand Chord, a line in the East Central Railway zone
 Howrah–Bardhaman chord (Barddhaman Chord Line), a section of the Kolkata Suburban Railway in Calcutta

Chord line may also refer to:
 a straight line connecting the leading and trailing edges of an airfoil
 Chord (geometry), a line segment joining two points on a curve
 Chord (astronomy), a line crossing a foreground astronomical object during an occultation which gives an indication of the objects size and/or shape

See also